The 1998 Men's Asian Games Rugby union Tournament was held in Royal Thai Army Stadium from December 10, 1998 to December 18, 1998.

Results
All times are Indochina Time (UTC+07:00)

Preliminary round

Group A

Group B

Final round

Semifinals

Bronze medal match

Final

Final standing

References
Results

External links
Schedule

Men